Trying to Recall was released on 21 March 2007, and is a studio album by Marie Lindberg. and her debut album.

Track listing
Leona (under Her Skin)
Blame it on Fate
Trying to Recall
Bound to Die     
This Time
Seize the Day
Why Can't We Kiss
All that I am
Suppose I Don't Love You
Revolt
Whatever will Happen

Contributors
Marie Lindberg - song, composer, song lyrics
Patrik Frisk - keyboards, bass, producer
Andreas Edin - guitar
Chris Rehn - guitar
Kristian Thuresson - guitar
Jan Robertsson - drums

Charts

Weekly charts

Year-end charts

References

2007 debut albums
Marie Lindberg albums